"Best Day Ever" is an episode of the animated television series SpongeBob SquarePants.

Best Day Ever or The Best Day Ever may also refer to:

 Best Day Ever (mixtape), a 2011 mixtape by Mac Miller
 The Best Day Ever, a 2006 SpongeBob SquarePants album
 Best Day Ever, a 2013 album by Rissi Palmer
 "Best Day Ever", a song by Blondie from the 2017 album Pollinator
 The Best Day Ever, an episode of the children's animated series Arthur

See also
 "This Is the Best Day Ever", a song by My Chemical Romance from the album I Brought You My Bullets, You Brought Me Your Love